Navwien is a possibly extinct language of Vanuatu, presumably one of the Malekula Interior languages. It was spoken in the southwestern corner of Malekula, near Malfaxal.

References

Malekula languages
Languages of Vanuatu
Extinct languages of Oceania
Critically endangered languages